Barnett Koch (March 23, 1923 – June 6, 1987) was an American second baseman in Major League Baseball who played for the Brooklyn Dodgers during the 1944 baseball season. Born in Campbell, Nebraska, he died at age 64 in Tacoma, Washington.

External links

1923 births
1987 deaths
Major League Baseball second basemen
Brooklyn Dodgers players
Baseball players from Nebraska
Montreal Royals players
People from Franklin County, Nebraska
Oregon Ducks baseball players